Ralph W. Wallace (October 30, 1904 - December 17, 1952) was a Republican Party member of the California State Assembly for the 78th district from 1935 to 1937. During World War I, he was in the United States Army.

References

United States Army personnel of World War I
Republican Party members of the California State Assembly
20th-century American politicians
1904 births
1952 deaths